Samsun Atatürk Museum is a former history museum in Samsun, northern Turkey dedicated to Mustafa Kemal Atatürk.

The museum is situated inside the old fair ground, and was opened to public as the "19 May Gallery" on July 1, 1968. It exhibits 114 items belonging to Mustafa Kemal Atatürk (1881–1938), the founder of modern Turkey, who set foot in Samsun on May 19, 1919 to start the Turkish War of Independence.

See also
 Samsun Gazi Museum

References

Atatürk Museum
History museums in Turkey
Museums established in 1968
İlkadım
1968 establishments in Turkey
Atatürk museums